Tanah Merah is a residential suburb in the City of Logan, Queensland, Australia. It was originally named by the Queensland Place Names Board in 1971.

Geography 

The suburb is dominated by a large hill. Red soil is found across the local area. Several parks with paths, exercise equipment and playgrounds are scattered across the sloping, residential landscape. Housing is mostly one storey detached brick houses with many multi-storey homes on the steeper slopes which are afforded views across the river valley.  The Pacific Motorway borders the suburb to the east and the Logan Motorway divides it and marks a small portion of the southern border. Here the slope is flat with houses built up to side of the motorway, hidden behind noise barrier walls.  

In the north west Slacks Creek joins the Logan River.  It was this area which was the first to be settled by Europeans. On north east border is the Logan Hyperdome. Part of the western boundary follows lower Slacks Creek.  The Pintu Drive off-ramp is the designated exit from the M1 for Tanah Merah and nearby is the Bryants Road overpass. The south eastern pocket of the suburb is positioned close to Loganholme State School.  The central parts are dominated by a ridge which remains partially vegetated.  This area provides habitat for wallabies and koalas.  Tansey Park on the river has a boat ramp, playground, and two sports ovals. A small caravan park is located on the Pacific Highway opposite the Hyperdome.

Murray's Road
Murray's Road is named after the Murray family who first settled in the area in the 1870s. The road (in part) is bordered by Slacks Creek and natural reserve. The original Murray farm is still located at the end of the road. It was farmed for 4 generations as a Dairy Farm (originally supplying milk to the Kingston Butter Factory. Robert (Jim) Murray was the last to operate the dairy which is no longer in use.

Murray's Road also provided access to timber carriage. Logs were brought in by bullock cart from the surrounding area and transported to sawmills up the Logan River. This was done by a rafting system (steamers) which would travel up Slacks Creek. Earth cuttings can still be seen in the hill to the side of the road where logs were rolled down for removal. Rafting Court is a small a street off Murray's Road which is named to remember the important role the timber distribution point had in supplying timber to the developing area.

Murray's Road also holds the largest single population of Austromyrtus gonoclada trees. Less than 300 specimens are known to exist and many are located along the road itself as well on adjoining property.

History
The suburb was first known as part of Slacks Creek.  Originally this land was bought and named by the McBride's, an English family who moved to Brisbane from Penang, Malaysia. The land was the first settlement for the McBride family in Australia and subsequently named it Tanah Merah, translating to red soil in Malay. The family were an airforce family who left Malaysia following World War II.

The hill side to the north of the Logan Motorway was once owned by the Murray family who sold it off in sections to developers. The Murray farm still exists in Tanah Merah and is located at the end of Murray's Road. The farm is no longer in use and was sold via auction in 2019.

The population of Tanah Merah expanded significantly between 2001 and 2006 after land to the west of Drews Road was developed into a housing estate. 

The median age of the Tanah Merah population was 33 years, 4 years below the national median of 37. 69.1% of people living in Tanah Merah were born in Australia. The other top responses for country of birth were New Zealand 8.2%, England 4.7%, South Africa 1.2%, Scotland 0.7%, Germany 0.5%.  87.2% of people spoke only English at home; the next most common languages were 1.2% Arabic, 0.7% Mandarin, 0.7% Spanish, 0.5% Hungarian, 0.4% German.

Education 
There are no schools in Tanah Merah. The nearest primary schools are Loganholme State School in neighbouring Loganholme to the south and Shailer Park State School and Kimberley Park State School, both in neighbouring Shailer Park to the north. The nearest secondary school is Shailer Park State High School in Shailer Park.

References

External links

 

Suburbs of Logan City